There have been two Formula One drivers from Thailand.

Current drivers 
Alex Albon is the second Formula One driver to race with a Thai licence and made his debut at the 2019 Australian Grand Prix for Toro Rosso, receiving a graduation to Red Bull ahead of the 2019 Belgian Grand Prix. Albon lost his race seat after the 2020 season, before returning with Williams for the  season.

Former drivers 
He scored 8 points and had a highest finishing position of fourth place which he achieved twice: at the 1950 Swiss Grand Prix and the 1954 French Grand Prix.

All-time table

References